Sally Lamb from Western Australia is an Australian Paralympic swimmer. At the 1968 Tel Aviv Games, she competed in two swimming events and won a silver medal in the Women's 25 m Backstroke Class 2 Incomplete.

References 

Female Paralympic swimmers of Australia
Swimmers at the 1968 Summer Paralympics
Paralympic silver medalists for Australia
Living people
Year of birth missing (living people)
Medalists at the 1968 Summer Paralympics
Paralympic medalists in swimming
Australian female backstroke swimmers